Kashiwa Airfield was an airfield on the outskirts of Tokyo, Japan. It was used by the Japanese Army Air Force until 30 October, when an artillery battery of the 112th Cavalry Regimental Combat Team occupied the base.

References

Airports in Japan